Cnemaspis baueri, also known commonly as Bauer's rock gecko or the Pulau Aur rock gecko, is a species of lizard in the family Gekkonidae. The species is endemic to Malaysia.

Etymology
The specific name, baueri, is in honor of American herpetologist Aaron Matthew Bauer.

Geographic range
C. baueri is found on Aur Island, Johor, Malaysia.

Habitat

Description

Reproduction
C. baueri is oviparous. Clutch size is two eggs per adult female. Eggs are laid in communal sites which may contain up to 250 eggs.

References

Further reading
Das I, Grismer LL (2003). "Two New Species of Cnemaspis Strauch, 1887 (Squamata: Gekkonidae) from the Seribuat Archipelago, Pahang and Johor States, West Malaysia". Herpetologica 59 (4): 544–552. (Cnemaspis baueri, new species).
Grismer LL, Quah ESH (2019). "An updated and annotated checklist of the lizards of Peninsular Malaysia, Singapore, and their adjacent archipelagos". Zootaxa 4545 (2): 230–248.

Cnemaspis
Reptiles described in 2003
Endemic fauna of Malaysia